"It Might as Well Be Spring" is a song from the 1945 film State Fair. which features the only original film score by the songwriting team of Richard Rodgers and Oscar Hammerstein II. "It Might as Well Be Spring" won the Academy Award for Best Original Song for that year.

Composition/ As a showtune

The song is sung early in the film by Margy the teenage daughter of the State Fair-bound Frake family, who is feeling the symptoms of spring fever. Oscar Hammerstein, the lyricist for the Rodgers & Hammerstein team, mentioned to Richard Rodgers that although state fairs were held in summer or autumn, for Margy – flushed by the stirrings of womanhood – "it might as well be spring". Rodgers immediately advised Hammerstein that the latter had just named the song.

An early version of the composition exists with an alternate melody. Music historian Todd Purdum described the alternate version in 2018:
 Rodgers envisioned "It Might as Well Be Spring" as a cheery uptempo number, it being the decision of the musical director of State Fair, Alfred Newman, to present the song as a moody ballad. Rodgers canvassed the film studio to protest Newman's decision, but did ultimately admit it was the right choice.

In the 1945 film Jeanne Crain played Margy Frake,  Margy's singing voice being dubbed by Louanne Hogan. In the 1962 remake of State Fair, in which Pamela Tiffin portrayed Margy, Anita Gordon provided the character's singing voice. Andrea McArdle as Margy performed "It Might as Well Be Spring" in the 1996 Broadway production of State Fair. Reviewing State Fair'''s pre-Broadway engagement at the Golden Gate Theater, Robert Hurwitt of the San Francisco Examiner deemed the "wondrous" song "It Might as Well be Spring" to be "as achingly wistful a romantic reverie as has ever been penned".

Recorded versions
Dick Haymes, who played Margy's brother Wayne Frake in the 1945 film, made the first hit recording of the song, released by Decca Records as catalog number 18706. Debuting on the Billboard magazine Best Seller chart dated 8 November 1945, the disc had a chart tenure of 12 weeks with a peak of #5. It was the flip side of "That's for Me" (also from State Fair), another top-10 best seller.

The recording by Paul Weston/Margaret Whiting was released by Capitol Records as catalog number 214. It first reached the Billboard magazine Best Seller chart on November 22, 1945, and lasted six weeks on the chart, peaking at #6.

The recording by Sammy Kaye was released by RCA Victor Records as catalog number 20-1738. It first reached the Billboard magazine Best Seller chart on December 20, 1945 and lasted four weeks on the chart, peaking at #8.

The recording by Paul Fenoulhet with The Skyrockets Dance Orchestra (with refrain song) was made in London on February 2, 1946, and released by EMI on the HMV Records label as catalogue number BD 5928.

"It Might as Well Be Spring" became a signature song for Sarah Vaughan whose recording - "her finest recorded ballad" according to Francis Davis - debuted on her 1949 Columbia release Sarah Vaughan in Hi-Fi.

In 1952, Harry James released a recording on the album Hollywood's Best (Columbia B-319 and CL-6224), with Rosemary Clooney on vocals.

Johnny Mathis recorded the song for his self-titled, 1956 debut album: Johnny Mathis. Also in 1956, it was featured by Blossom Dearie (in French) on her album: Blossom Dearie.

The version by Ray Conniff and his Orchestra & Chorus can be found on his album, Hollywood In Rhythm (1958).

In 1959, singer and pianist Nina Simone sang it on her first album for Colpix Records, titled The Amazing Nina Simone. The same year, Shirley Jones and Jack Cassidy released their version on the album With Love From Hollywood.

In 1961, the song was a hit for Frank Sinatra on his album Sinatra and Strings, and Ella Fitzgerald also recorded it on her live Verve release: Ella in Hollywood.

In 1964 Stan Getz and Astrud Gilberto recorded a live Bossa Nova version of the song in the New York cafe au Go Go.

Andy Williams released a version on his 1962 album: Moon River and Other Great Movie Themes.

Bill Evans released a version on his 1962 album Moon Beams.

Peggy Lee sang a swinging version of the song on her 1967 album Somethin’ Groovy!Starting a cappella with the instruments entering on the bridge, the song is sung by Cleo Laine on her 1973 RCA Victor "I am a Song".  This album was released the year after her 1972 United States debut at Lincoln Center.

On April 15, 1982, Mel Tormé and George Shearing recorded a live version of the song at The Peacock Court, Hotel Mark Hopkins in San Francisico, CA for their live album "An Evening with George Shearing & Mel Tormé".

Karrin Allyson included it in her debut album I Didn't Know About You (1992)

John Pizzarelli with his trio and guest Harry Allen on tenor sax recorded a very mellow version on After Hours (1995).

Jazz pianist Brad Mehldau plays this with his trio in his 1995 studio album Introducing Brad Mehldau. His version runs at about 280 beats per minute in a 7-in-a-bar meter. On the 2000 live double CD Progression, The Art of the Trio Volume 5, Mehldau performs a shorter version at the same tempo and meter, without improvised solos but with an extended improvised coda on the turnaround.

Welsh baritone Bryn Terfel included the song on his 1996 album Something Wonderful: Bryn Terfel Sings Rodgers & Hammerstein.Bernadette Peters performed the song in the album Bernadette Peters Loves Rodgers & Hammerstein (2002).

Jazz singer Jane Monheit performs the song as an up-tempo swing waltz on Live at the Rainbow Room (2003).

Jazz vocalist Stevie Holland performs a swinging rendition in the album Restless Willow (2004).

In 2013, a recording of the song by Shirley Bassey was released on the album Hold Me Tight.

On the 2014 album Last Dance, Keith Jarrett and Charlie Haden played the song. Last Dance'' was the second and last album they recorded together.

Jazz vocalist Tatiana Eva-Marie performs a French-language version with Avalon Jazz Band.

References

1945 songs
Songs with lyrics by Oscar Hammerstein II
Songs with music by Richard Rodgers
Johnny Mathis songs
Margaret Whiting songs
Nina Simone songs
Andy Williams songs
Best Original Song Academy Award-winning songs
Songs from Rodgers and Hammerstein musicals
State Fair (franchise)